Outlaws of Time: The Song of Glory and Ghost is a 2017 young adult novel by N. D. Wilson, published by Katherine Tegen Books. It is the second book in the Outlaws of Time series, being a sequel to The Legend of Sam Miracle.

Common Sense Media called it a "wild, exciting ride, especially for tween readers." Kirkus Reviews pointed out its "free-and-easy use of indigenous tropes," and a Peter Pan theme which "mainly serves to cement some retrograde gender roles."

References

2017 American novels
2017 fantasy novels
American young adult novels
Children's fantasy novels
Novels by N. D. Wilson
Katherine Tegen Books books